Tom Tykwer (born 23 May 1965) is a German film director, producer, screenwriter, and composer. He is best known internationally for directing the thriller films Run Lola Run (1998), Heaven (2002), Perfume: The Story of a Murderer (2006), and The International (2009). He collaborated with The Wachowskis as co-director for the science fiction film Cloud Atlas (2012) and the Netflix series Sense8 (2015–2018), and worked on the score for Lana Wachowski's The Matrix Resurrections (2021). Tykwer is also well known as the co-creator of the internationally acclaimed German television series Babylon Berlin (2017–).

Early life

Tykwer was born in Wuppertal, West Germany. Fascinated by film from an early age, he started making amateur Super 8 films at the age of eleven. He later helped out at a local arthouse cinema in order to see more films, including those for which he was too young to buy tickets. After graduating from high school, he applied to numerous film schools around Europe, unsuccessfully.

Career

1986-1995

Tykwer moved to Berlin where he worked as a projectionist. In 1987, at the age of 22, he became the programmer of the Moviemento cinema and became known to German directors as a film buff. In Berlin, Tykwer met and befriended the filmmaker Rosa von Praunheim, who urged him to create stories from his own experience. He suggested, for example, that Tykwer record arguments with his girlfriend, and turn them into a short film. Because (1990) was screened at the Hof International Film Festival and well received by the audience, which inspired Tykwer to continue pursuing filmmaking. 

He made a second short film, Epilog (1992), for which he took on personal financial debt, but he also gained valuable technical film making experience. Tykwer wrote the screenplay for, and directed, his first feature film, the psychological thriller Deadly Maria (1993). It aired on German television and had a limited theatrical release in Germany and the international film festival circuit.

In 1994, Tykwer founded the production company X Filme Creative Pool with Stefan Arndt, Wolfgang Becker, and Dani Levy.

1996-2005

Tykwer and Becker wrote the screenplay for the comedy Life Is All You Get (1997), while working on Winter Sleepers (1997), Tykwer's second feature and a much bigger and more complex production than Deadly Maria. Winter Sleepers brought Tykwer to the attention of German cineastes and film festivals, but he was struggling financially.

His next feature film, Run Lola Run (1998), became the most successful German film of 1998, earned $7 million at the US box office, and elevated Tykwer to international fame. As Lola was becoming a success worldwide, Tykwer was already at work on his next film, The Princess and the Warrior (2000), a love story about a nurse and a former soldier, which was shot in his home town of Wuppertal. 

Miramax produced his next film, Heaven (2002), based on a screenplay by Polish filmmaker Krzysztof Kieślowski, which was shot in English, starred Cate Blanchett and Giovanni Ribisi, and was filmed in Turin and Tuscany.

2006-2015

Tykwer was approached by French producers to film a short contribution to Paris, je t'aime (2006), a film composed of 20 short films by many famous directors depicting love in Paris. Tykwer shot the 10-minute short film, True, with Natalie Portman and Melchior Beslon. He shot the film quickly with almost no pre-production. The result, Tykwer later said, "symbolises an entire life for me, in just ten minutes."

Tykwer shot the film Pink Children (2012) together with 4 German directors about their mentor Rosa von Praunheim.

Tykwer's next film was Perfume: The Story of a Murderer (2006), an adaptation of the novel Perfume by the German novelist Patrick Süskind. It was filmed in the Spanish cities of Figueras, Girona and Barcelona. Tykwer later made his Hollywood debut with the big-budgeted 2009 conspiracy thriller The International, starring Clive Owen and Naomi Watts, which was shot in several locations ranging from Berlin, Milan, New York City, and Istanbul. The film received a lukewarm reception from the public and critics alike.

2016-present
Tykwer directed 2016's A Hologram for the King, starring Tom Hanks and Sarita Choudhury, based on a novel by American novelist Dave Eggers. In 2017, Tykwer co-created the television series Babylon Berlin, directing and writing the screenplay; set in 1920s Berlin, the series comprises 16 episodes in its first two seasons. A third season premiered in 2020.

Musical composition
Since Winter Sleepers, the music for all of Tykwer's films (with the exception of Heaven) has been composed by Johnny Klimek, Reinhold Heil, and Tykwer, unusual for a film director. The trio gave themselves the name "Pale 3", and it originally worked as a film scoring group, then expanding to produce music unrelated to film.

Critical reception

Both Tykwer's directing and his musical contributions have received accolades.

Awards
 1994: Bavarian Film Awards, Best New Director
 1998: Bavarian Film Awards, Best Production
 2005: State-Award of the Film Commission North Rhine-Westphalia
 2006: Bavarian Film Awards, Best Director
 2012: Golden Globe Awards, Best Original Score for Cloud Atlas (Nominated)

Filmography

Other roles
 Inglourious Basterds (2009) — German dialogue translator.

Personal life
In 2009, Tykwer signed a petition in support of film director Roman Polanski, calling for his release after Polanski was arrested in Switzerland in relation to his 1977 sexual abuse case.

References

External links 

 
 
 Tom Tykwer at Filmportal.de
 Interview at Stumped?
 The Art of Scriptwriting: Tom Tykwer on Matrix 4 at the 21. international literature festival berlin

1965 births
Best Director German Film Award winners
Film people from North Rhine-Westphalia
German film directors
German film score composers
Living people
Male film score composers
Mass media people from Wuppertal
Members of the Academy of Arts, Berlin
Postmodernist filmmakers